There Will Be Blood is the soundtrack to the 2007 film There Will Be Blood and features an original orchestral score by Radiohead guitarist Jonny Greenwood. The soundtrack was released on December 17, 2007 in the United Kingdom and on December 18, 2007 in the United States.

Although widely admired and thought of as a contender for the Academy Award for Best Original Score at the 2008 Academy Awards, it was ruled ineligible due to its use of pre-existing material. The score features elements from Greenwood's compositions 'Popcorn Superhet Receiver' and Bodysong (such as the track "Convergence", played atop the title track during the derrick fire sequence) and works from Arvo Pärt and the Violin Concerto in D by Johannes Brahms.

In December 2008, Greenwood's score was nominated for a Grammy in the category of "Best Score Soundtrack Album For Motion Picture, Television Or Other Visual Media" for the 51st Grammy Awards.

Nonesuch Records offers a digital download of three bonus tracks upon the purchase of the soundtrack from its web site.

Greenwood's wife, Israeli-born Sharona Katan, (credited as Shin Katan) is a visual artist whose work appears on the cover as well as the booklet. The images were made with liquid photographic emulsion and oil paint, using the original anamorphic camera negatives from the film.

Track listing

References 

Jonny Greenwood albums
2007 soundtrack albums
Nonesuch Records soundtracks
Instrumental soundtracks
Drama film soundtracks